Beurre blanc ("white butter" in French) is a warm emulsified butter sauce made with a reduction of vinegar and/or white wine (normally Muscadet) and shallots into which softened whole butter is whisked in off the heat to prevent separation. The small amount of  emulsifiers naturally found in butter are used to form an oil-in-water emulsion. Although similar to hollandaise in concept, it is considered neither a classic leading nor compound sauce. This sauce originates in Loire Valley cuisine.

Origin 

The chef Clémence Lefeuvre (née Clémence Prau) invented beurre blanc, apparently by accident, sometime around the beginning of the 20th century. She served this sauce at her restaurant "La Buvette de la Marine" in the hamlet of La Chebuette in the village of Saint-Julien-de-Concelles on the banks of the Loire River a few kilometers upstream from Nantes.

Legend holds that she intended to prepare a béarnaise sauce to go with pike but forgot to add the tarragon and egg yolks. Some sources claim that this invention occurred while she worked as a cook for the Marquis de Goulaine at Château de Goulaine. Aristide Briand, long-time prime minister of France and Nobel Peace Prize laureate, said at her death in 1932 that it "was a bit like national mourning."

Preparation

A good beurre blanc is rich and buttery, with a neutral flavor that responds well to other seasonings and flavorings, thereby lending itself to the addition of herbs and spices. It should be light yet still liquid and thick enough to cling to food, also known as nappe.

Beurre blanc is prepared by reducing wine, vinegar, shallots, and herbs (if used) until it is nearly dry. Although not necessary, cream can be added at this point as a stabilizer to the sauce. Lemon juice is sometimes used in place of vinegar, and stock can also be added. Cold, one-inch cubes of butter are then gradually incorporated into the sauce as the butter melts and the mixture is whisked.

The sauce can separate by either overheating or cooling. If it heats past , some emulsifying proteins begin to break down and release the butterfat they hold in an emulsion. The butterfat will solidify if the sauce cools below .

Derivatives

Beurre rouge
Beurre rouge (English: "red butter") is a variant of the beurre blanc sauce that is prepared by substituting a dry red wine for the white wine and red wine vinegar for the white wine vinegar.

See also

Beurre monté
Beurre noir
Beurre noisette

References

Butter
French sauces